Father James Nicholas Chern (born November 6, 1973) is a Roman Catholic priest in the Archdiocese of Newark, serving as the archdiocese's Director of Campus Ministry. He is also chaplain and director of the Newman Center at Montclair State University.

Chern is known for his appearances on "The Catholic Guy Show" with Lino Rulli, a radio show airing on Sirius XM Satellite Radio, from 2007 until his departure in 2019.

Early life
Chern is the son of George and Jo Ann ( Trippodi) Chern. He has two brothers, Christopher and Craig.

Chern graduated from DeSales University in Center Valley, Pennsylvania with a degree in theology and philosophy in 1995 and received a Master of Theology degree from Seton Hall University in 1999.

Ministry
He was ordained on May 29, 1999 and installed parochial vicar of Our Lady of Lourdes Roman Catholic Church in West Orange, New Jersey, where he served for seven years.

In 2007, Chern was named chaplain and director of the Newman Center at Montclair State University, a position he still holds. He was named Director of Campus Ministry for the Archdiocese of Newark in 2018 by Cardinal Joseph Tobin. He has been called America's favorite college campus minister.

Radio career
Chern's radio career began in August 2007 when he appeared as a guest on "The Catholic Guy Show"  with Lino Rulli for a segment focusing on prayer. Chern originally got Sirius XM to listen to Howard Stern, and eventually stumbled upon Rulli's show where "for about 15 minutes, [he] couldn't tell if the show was pro-Catholic or anti-Catholic." In September 2016, after years of being a periodic guest, he was chosen to co-host alongside Rulli, appearing on Thursdays and Fridays. Chern remained co-host until his announced departure in June 2019.

See also

The Catholic Guy Show
Lino Rulli
The Catholic Channel

References

External links

1973 births
American radio personalities
American Roman Catholic priests
DeSales University alumni
Living people
Seton Hall University alumni
People from Montclair, New Jersey